The 2013 Scottish Cup Final was the 128th final of the Scottish Cup, the most prestigious knockout football competition in Scotland. The match took place at Hampden Park on 26 May 2013 and was contested by Hibernian and Celtic. It was the first time the two clubs had played each other in the Scottish Cup since the 2001 final, which Celtic won 3–0, but Hibs' second consecutive final following their heavy defeat against Hearts the previous year. For the first time in its history, the Scottish Cup Final was played on a Sunday.

Celtic won the match 3–0, taking a 2–0 lead in the first through two Gary Hooper goals, before Joe Ledley added a third late in the second half. It was their 36th win of the Cup, extending their own record.

Route to the final

Hibernian

Scottish Premier League club Hibernian entered the competition in the Fourth Round. They began their campaign against cup holders Heart of Midlothian at Easter Road. The only goal of the game was scored by midfielder David Wotherspoon. Hibs then took on SPL opposition again, this time in the shape of Aberdeen. Hibs won 1–0 courtesy of a Gary Deegan strike, with the winning margin being preserved by a penalty kick save by Ben Williams.

In the quarter-final Hibs were drawn against another SPL club, Kilmarnock. Leigh Griffiths scored a hat-trick as Hibs won through by 4–2. In the semi final at Hampden Park, Hibs faced Falkirk in an enthralling encounter. Despite falling three goals behind within half an hour, Hibs managed to pull back this deficit to force extra time. Leigh Griffiths scored a late winner, sending Hibs to their first consecutive Scottish Cup final appearances for 89 years.

Celtic

Celtic also entered the competition at the fourth round (last 32) stage and were drawn at home against Second Division club Arbroath. Manager Neil Lennon made several changes to his team for the match, which was played a few days before a crucial UEFA Champions League match against Spartak Moscow. Celtic took the lead through an own goal by Arbroath, but missed chances and Arbroath scored a late equalising goal to force a replay at Gayfield Park. Arbroath again gave Celtic a difficult test in the replay, despite conceding an early goal scored by Adam Matthews. This proved to be the only goal of the game and Celtic progressed to the fifth round, against Raith Rovers. Played on a heavy and bumpy Starks Park pitch, Celtic eventually overcame a defensive performance by Raith to win 3–0, with Kris Commons, Charlie Mulgrew and James Forrest scoring the goals.

In the quarter-finals, Celtic were drawn away to St Mirren, who had eliminated Celtic from the 2012–13 Scottish League Cup a month beforehand. Early goals by Joe Ledley and Anthony Stokes, either side of an equaliser by St Mirren, gave Celtic a 2–1 victory at St Mirren Park. In the second semi-final at Hampden Park, Celtic won a thrilling match by 4–3 after extra time against Dundee United. A Kris Commons goal gave Celtic an early lead, but United scored twice midway through the first half to lead 2–1. Victor Wanyama scored an equaliser almost immediately and Commons scored another goal after 60 minutes to give Celtic a 3–2 lead. Jon Daly scored his second goal of the game to equalise and force extra time. Soon after Daly had hit the post, Anthony Stokes scored the winning goal.

Pre-match
This was Hibs 13th appearance in the Scottish Cup Final. They had previously won two Scottish Cups (in 1887 and 1902), and been beaten in ten finals. Celtic appeared in their 55th Scottish Cup Final and had won the Scottish Cup on 35 previous occasions, most recently in 2011. The clubs had previously met in five Scottish Cup Finals, most recently in 2001. Hibs won the first Scottish Cup Final meeting in 1902, with Celtic winning the four subsequent meetings in 1914 (after a replay), 1923, 1972 and 2001.

For the first time in its history, the Scottish Cup Final was played on a Sunday. This was done to comply with UEFA regulations which prohibit televised matches being played on the same day as the UEFA Champions League Final. The 2012 Scottish Cup Final was played on the same day as the 2012 UEFA Champions League Final, but this was done under a one-year waiver offered by UEFA. Fixture congestion meant that the 2013 Scottish Cup Final could not be moved to an earlier weekend.

Both clubs received an allocation of approximately 20,000 tickets, out of a total capacity at Hampden Park of 52,063. The remaining seats were accounted for by Hampden Park debenture holders, hospitality, sponsors, media and segregation areas. Tickets cost £35 in the North and South Stands, with prices set at £28 for adults and £10 for concessions (adults aged over 65, matriculated students and children under 16 years old) in the West and East Stands.

Match
Willie Collum was appointed to referee the match, with Willie Conquer and Martin Cryans as his assistants. For the first time in a competitive Scottish match, additional assistant referees were appointed.

Report
Celtic opened the scoring in the 8th minute; a poor clearance from Hibs defender Alan Maybury was intercepted by Anthony Stokes who sent a cross from the left beyond the reach of goalkeeper Ben Williams and was side-footed into the goal by Gary Hooper. Despite the conceding of an early goal, Hibs did not crumble but it was Celtic who continued to create the better goalscoring chances.  On 31 minutes, Celtic doubled their lead.  Stokes sent in another cross from the left, and Hooper ran in between two Hibs defenders to shoot past Williams in goal.

The second half was a quiet affair, but Celtic sealed their victory with a third goal on 80 minutes.  Mikael Lustig set up Hooper with an excellent chance to complete his hat trick, but the Celtic striker mis-kicked. The ball broke to Joe Ledley, who fired a powerful shot into the top corner of Williams' goal to put Celtic 3–0 ahead.

Details

Match officials
Referee:
 Willie Collum
Assistant referees:
 Willie Conquer
 Martin Cryans
Additional assistant referees:
 Bobby Madden
 John Beaton
Fourth official: 
 Alan Mulvanny

Match rules
 90 minutes.
 30 minutes of extra time if necessary.
 Penalty shoot-out if scores still level.
 Five named substitutes.
 Maximum of three substitutions.

References

2013
1
Hibernian F.C. matches
Celtic F.C. matches
2010s in Glasgow
May 2013 sports events in the United Kingdom